Qarah Owri (also Romanized as Qarah Owrī; also known as Qareh Āvar) is a village in Qezel Uzan Rural District, in the Central District of Meyaneh County, East Azerbaijan Province, Iran. At the 2006 census, its population was 235, in 56 families.

References 

Populated places in Meyaneh County